The R72 is a provincial route in Eastern Cape, South Africa that connects the N2 east of Port Elizabeth with East London via Port Alfred. It provides an alternative to the N2 for travel between Port Elizabeth and East London.

Route 
The R72 begins in the city of East London in the Buffalo City Metropolitan Municipality, at an off-ramp junction with the N2 Highway. North of this junction, it is the N6 National Route to Bloemfontein.

The R72 begins by going southwards for 6 kilometres from the N2 interchange as the North East Expressway, immediately crossing the Nahoon River and becoming a partial highway with off-ramp junctions, up to the Fleet Street junction in the suburb of Quigney, where it becomes Fleet Street westwards. It goes westwards for 9 kilometres, through East London's Central Business District, crossing the Buffalo River, to become Settlers Way and reach the East London Airport entrance.

From the East London Airport, the R72 follows the Eastern Cape Coast westwards for 127 km, bypassing the East London Coast Nature Reserve, bypassing Kidd's Beach and meeting the southern terminus of the R346 Road, bypassing the Great Fish River's mouth, to the town of Port Alfred, where it meets the southern terminus of the R67 Road before passing through the town centre.

It crosses the Kowie River in the town centre before leaving Port Alfred westwards and continuing for 22 kilometres to the town of Kenton-on-Sea, where it meets the southern terminus of the R343 Road. It crosses both the Kariega River and the Boesmans River near their mouths before turning away from the coast and continuing westwards for 23 kilometres to the town of Alexandria.

From Alexandria, the R72 continues westwards for 50 kilometres as the Fonteinkloof Pass to reach its western terminus, where it forms another interchange with the N2 Highway about 45 kilometres north-east of Port Elizabeth (35 kilometres north-east of Coega; 12 kilometres north-east of Colchester). It meets the southern terminus of the N10 National Route at the same interchange.

References

External links
 Routes Travel Info

72
Provincial routes in South Africa